Ilana is a Hebrew feminine given name, the female form of the word אִילָן (tree). Notable people with the name include:

Ilana Adir (born 1941), Israeli Olympic sprinter
Ilana Avital (born 1960), Israeli singer
Ilana Krausman Ben-Amos (born 1949), Israeli professor
Ilana Berger (born 1965), Israeli tennis player
Ilana Casoy (born 1960), Brazilian writer
Ilana Cicurel (born 1972), French lawyer and politician
Ilana Cohen (born 1943), Israeli politician
Ilana Davidson, American operatic soprano
Ilana Dayan (born 1964), Israeli journalist
Ilana Duff, Canadian Paralympic athlete
Ilana Eliya (born 1955), Israeli singer
Ilana Frank, Canadian film producer
Ilana Glazer (born 1987), American comedian and actress
Ilana Halperin (born 1973), American artist
Ilana Harris-Babou (born 1991), American sculptor
Ilana Karaszyk (born 1938), Israeli Olympic runner and long jumper
Ilana Kloss (born 1956), South African tennis player, World #1 in doubles
Ilana Kratysh (born 1990), Israeli freestyle wrestler
Ilana Kurshan, Israeli author
Ilana Levine (born 1963), American actress
Ilana Löwy (born 1948), Polish historian
Ilana Mushin, Australian linguist
Ilana Neumann, Dominican Republic politician
Ilana Panich-Linsman (born 1984), American journalist
Ilana Paul-Binyamin, Israeli academic
Ilana Salama Ortar (born 1949), Egyptian visual artist
Ilana Raviv (born 1945), Israeli artist
Ilana Rovina (1934-2020), Israeli singer
Ilana Rovner (born 1938), Latvian judge
Ilana Rubel (born 1972), American politician
Ilana Sod (born 1973), Mexican television presenter
Ilana Verdansky, fictional character on the ABC television show Lost.
Ilana Vered (born 1943), Israeli pianist
Ilana B. Witten, American neuroscientist
Ilana Yahav, Israeli artist

Hebrew feminine given names